The TNT Tropang Giga is a professional basketball team currently owned by Smart Communications, a subsidiary of the Philippine Long Distance Telephone Company (PLDT), playing in the Philippine Basketball Association (PBA) since 1990.

The franchise began in 1990 when Pepsi-Cola Products Philippines, Inc. (PCPPI) acquired a PBA franchise. Under PCPPI, the franchise played under the names Pepsi and 7 Up. In 1996, the franchise came under the control of Pilipino Telephone Corporation (Piltel) and played under the name Mobiline. In 2001, the franchise was renamed Talk 'N Text after the operations of Piltel was absorbed by Smart Communications.

The team is currently one of three PBA teams under the control of businessman Manuel V. Pangilinan – the others are the Meralco Bolts and NLEX Road Warriors. To date, the franchise has won seven official PBA titles (and one special PBA tournament championship), it also remains as one of the league's powerhouses and it is one of the oldest teams in PBA.

Pepsi-Cola/7 Up (Pepsi-Cola Products Philippines, Inc., 1990–1996)
Pepsi-Cola Products Philippines, Inc. was accepted as one of two new members of the PBA during the 1990 season, joining soft drink rival Pop Cola. They were known as the Pepsi Hotshots in their maiden year 1990. Their first coach was Ed Ocampo, assisted by Olympian Bobby Littaua, and the team manager was Steve Watson.

After winning its inaugural game against another expansion team Pop Cola, 149–130, with import Derek Hamilton scoring 77 points, the Hotshots lost all their remaining games in the first conference. Their 15-game losing streak stretched into the All-Filipino, before they finally won over Diet Sarsi, formerly Pop Cola. In the third conference, San Miguel Beermen assistant coach Derrick Pumaren replaced Ed Ocampo as the Hotshots' head coach, and the Pepsi franchise went 0 wins, 10 losses in the season-ending tournament.

In 1991, Pepsi acquired Manny Victorino from Presto, and the team increased its number of wins, but still failed to make it past eliminations in the first two conferences. They attempted to become a competitive team by offering a 5-year, P25 million contract to Purefoods TJ Hotdogs' top gun Alvin Patrimonio. Patrimonio stayed with Purefoods after his mother team matched the offer. However, this did not stop Pepsi from entering the semifinals and finishing fourth among the eight teams in the third conference.

In 1992, Pepsi acquired ROY Eugene Quilban in a trade which sent Jun Reyes to Alaska. The Hotshots placed seventh in the first conference. After the Pepsi "349" controversy, the team was renamed as the 7 Up Uncolas.

7 Up placed runner-up in the 1992 Reinforced Conference. Their import was an NBA veteran point guard, Dell Demps. They were swept by the Swift Mighty Meaties, led by Tony Harris in the finals, 4–0. Prior to the finals, 7 Up and Swift were fined on a so-so game where Swift intentionally lost the match in order to eliminate Ginebra from the finals race. 7 Up was bannered by players Manny Victorino, Abet Guidaben, Eugene Quilban and Naning Valenciano. Quilban recorded 28 assists during a game that year, which is still a PBA record.

Despite getting second overall pick Victor Pablo, 7 Up failed to reach the semifinals in the first two conferences of the season. In the third conference, the team's name reverted to Pepsi, but to be known as the Pepsi Mega Bottlers. They eventually placed fourth in the 1993 Governors' Cup.

Before the 1994 PBA Governor's Cup, Pepsi and Sunkist were involved in a rare coaching trade that saw Derrick Pumaren moving to the RFM franchise for Yeng Guiao. Despite the coaching change, Pepsi's on-and-off performance continued with their best finish, taking third place in the 1994 Governors' Cup with import Ronnie Coleman. In the 1995, even with a strong start in the Governors' Cup, they had a 5–2 win–loss card but never took home a trophy at the end of the tournament.

Pepsi was also known as a hard-luck PBA team because it never found considerable success after finishing runner-up in the 1992 Reinforced Conference. After it failed to land Alvin Patrimonio in 1991, the ballclub attempted again in 1995 to dangle a 5-year, P28.8 million contract to Sta. Lucia Realtors' main man Jun Limpot. However, Sta. Lucia matched the offer and Pepsi had to contend with blue-collar players in Alvin Teng (acquired from San Miguel in exchange for Victor Pablo), Dindo Pumaren (from Purefoods in exchange for Richie Ticzon), Eugene Quilban and Boy Cabahug to lead the team.

Mobiline (Pilipino Telephone Corporation, 1996–2001)

Before the start of the 1996 season, Frederick Dael took over as the new president of Pepsi Cola Products Philippines, Inc. A change in marketing priority took effect and the owners mulled disbanding the PBA franchise. To prevent the team from being disbanded, Luis, "Moro" Lorenzo, chairman of PCPPI, intended to sell the PBA franchise to Duty Free Philippines, a company he also owned, for one peso (P1) to retain its ownership. If Duty Free would have disbanded the PBA franchise, it would have returned to Pepsi. The sale was rejected by the Board of Governors on a special meeting on January 5 since Duty Free was not majority-owned by Lorenzo. The Hotshots continued on with their campaign in the All-Filipino Cup, finishing last with a 4–10 record.

After the All-Filipino Cup, PBA Board of Governors approved the ownership transfer of the franchise from Pepsi Cola Products Philippines, Inc. to Lapanday Holdings Corporation, a holding company of the Lorenzo family. This would enable the Lorenzos to market and use a different brand for their PBA team. Pagemark Philippines, Inc., a company under Lapanday Holdings and Pilipino Telephone Corporation (PILTEL) were tasked to find a new name for the team. After negotiations, the team was rechristened as the Mobiline Cellulars.

Since the Lorenzos still owned the team through their holding company, the records of the Pepsi team were retained. Point guard Eugene Quilban and power forward Alvin Teng led the team.

Mobiline acquired the first overall pick from Pop Cola and used it to draft Filipino-American Andrew John Seigle. The Cellulars also drafted Tony Boy Espinosa and signed Patrick Fran from free agency. Mobiline hired former San Miguel coach Norman Black, and acquired 1995 Rookie of the Year Jeffrey Cariaso from Alaska via an offer sheet bearing a three-year contract worth P18.3 million.

In the All-Filipino Conference, the Cellulars advanced to the semifinals but faltered in the Commissioner's Cup with Isaiah Morris as reinforcement. In the Governor's Cup, they paraded Artemus "Tee" McClary and hired a new coach, Derrick Pumaren, with Tommy Manotoc as consultant. Mobiline posted a decent finish in the Governor's Cup but failed to enter the semis.

In 1998, the Phone Pals struggled in the All-Filipino with a 4–7 record. In the Commissioner's Cup, it hired former Purefoods mentor Eric Altamirano. The Pals, as in the '97 Governor's Cup, were eliminated in the quarterfinals with Terquin Mott as import.

Centennial Cup Champions
Andy Seigle and Jeffrey Cariaso were borrowed by the national team for the 1998 Asian Games in Bangkok. They captured the 1998 PBA Centennial (the Philippines was then celebrating its 100th anniversary of the independence from Spain) Cup by beating Shell by a hairline, 67–66, in overtime led by imports Silas Mills and McClary, with the help of veteran locals Glen Capacio and Al Solis. However, the Centennial Cup was a special tournament and the title was not considered an official championship.

The records after the elimination round of the tournament was carried over in the Governor's Cup. The Pals retained their winning way and advanced to the finals in a rematch with the Zoom Masters. Mobiline held a 3–2 series lead but lost the last two games to wind up in second place. Mills ended up winning the Best Import of the Governors' Cup.

Asi Taulava era, (1999–2007)
Seeking for bigger things in 1999, Mobiline acquired Filipino-Tongan Pauliasi Taulava to man the Pals' frontline along with Seigle. Mobiline started the All-Filipino with a 7–0 record before losing a crucial game to San Miguel. The Pals ended up with the best record after the elimination phase but were defeated by a gritty Barangay Ginebra Kings squad despite a twice to beat advantage on Bal David's incredible last second shot.

The rest of the year, Mobiline was eliminated in the quarters during the Commissioner's and Governor's Cup, while Taulava's eligibility as a legitimate Filipino-foreigner was questioned. During the midseason, Mobiline traded Andy Seigle to Purefoods for veteran Jerry Codinera.

2000 saw some lineup changes for the Phone Pals, as the team acquired Vic Pablo in the three-team trade that sent Jeffrey Cariaso to Tanduay and Mark Telan to Shell Velocity.

Taulava was deported later in the year as the Pals were eliminated in the quarterfinals of the All-Filipino with new coach Louie Alas. The Pals wound up with the best record in the elimination phase of the Governor's Cup. After surviving a quarterfinals meeting with Barangay Ginebra, Purefoods eliminated Mobiline in four games. The Phone Pals finished fourth after losing to Batang Red Bull Thunder in a knockout game for third place.

In 2001, Mobiline tried to acquire Kenneth Duremdes through free agency, but Alaska matched Mobiline's offer sheet of a reported 48 million pesos, and Duremdes stayed with the Aces. The Phone Pals drafted former Manila Metrostar Gilbert Demape, but the Phone Pals, for the sixth time in seven conferences, were eliminated by top seed Shell in the quarterfinals. In the Commissioner's Cup, the Pals bannered Michigan University standout Jerod Ward, who exploded for 61 points in his debut. Later, Taulava returned to the Philippines after an approval by the Justice Department; despite this, the Phone Pals failed to get past the quarterfinals. The Governor's Cup also held the same fate for the Phone Pals despite changing their name to "Talk 'N Text" and having Brandon Williams as import.

Talk 'N Text (Smart Communications, 2001–present)

Beginning in the 2001 Governors' Cup, the franchise came under the control of Smart Communications after the company absorbed the operations of Pilipino Telephone Corporation. The team changed its name to "Talk 'N Text Phone Pals".

Under foreign coaches

Before the 2002 season, Talk 'N Text fired Alas and hired former UNLV coach Bill Bayno, despite numerous calls by the nationalist Basketball Coaches Association of the Philippines to ban the American mentor. Although they lost Asi Taulava and Patrick Fran to the National Pool, Talk 'N Text was bannered by Richie Frahm and Jerald Honeycutt, a replacement for an original import. The Phone Pals ended up as the top team in the elimination phase of the Governor's Cup but suffered the same fate as in 1999, when the eighth seed San Miguel Beermen upset the Pals.

Talk 'N Text finally broke the spell in the Commissioner's Cup, led by Honeycutt and Pete Mickeal, when the seventh seeded Phone Pals defeated Sta. Lucia in the quarterfinals and Alaska in a five-game semis affair to enter their third Finals appearance in team history, and the first since 1998. In the end, Red Bull defeated Talk 'N Text in seven grueling games.

Bayno later left the team, but without some parting shots on the PBA when he accused the league of favoring the San Miguel Corporation teams.

In the All-Filipino, Taulava returned to the team after his national team stint in the Asian Games, but the Phone Pals got the early boot in the quarterfinals under new head coach Paul Woolpert, another American coach who replaced the departed Bill Bayno.

Jimmy Alapag-Harvey Carey era 
In 2003, the Phone Pals used two first round picks to draft Fil-Americans Harvey Carey and Jimmy Alapag, who was with the RP national pool in 2002. The Pals struggled early in the All-Filipino. Midway to that tournament, Woolpert left the team and was replaced with Ateneo coach Joel Banal, who had led the Blue Eagles to the UAAP title in 2002.

2003 All-Filipino Championship

Talk 'N Text rose to the tournament and captured the All-Filipino Cup over defending champion Coca-Cola in six games. After an overtime win in Game Five, the Phone Pals became the first team since 1982 to come back from a 0–2 deficit to win the next four games after a hard-fought Game Six victory. Taulava was named as the PBA Finals MVP, after winning the Best Player of the Conference award.

Post-championship era

They also qualified in the 2003 PBA Invitationals, where four guest teams were invited. Joel Banal left the team for the moment to concentrate on his Ateneo Blue Eagles stint in the UAAP. The Phone Pals did not qualify for the semis, but not without controversy. Needing to win by eight points over Red Bull Barako to qualify, the Phone Pals deliberately fouled several Red Bull players in the last two minutes to force an overtime or even reach the needed eight point margin. The game turned out to be more disgraceful when Jojo Manalo tried to hit a three-pointer on Red Bull's basket. The incident led to a hefty fine and a five-game suspension for acting coach Ariel Vanguardia.

In the revived Reinforced Conference, Talk 'N Text was bannered by Damian Cantrell but finished with a 7–6 mark, good for fourth place in Group B. They upset the top seeded Red Bull Barako 2–1 that ended with Jimwell Torion's clothesline on Jimmy Alapag's face that led to the latter's suspension for eight months, which was later reduced.

In the semis, Talk 'N Text was swept by eventual champions Coca-Cola, but the Phone Pals captured third place in the tournament after beating Sta. Lucia in a one-game playoff for third place.

Asi Taulava became the first Filipino-foreign player since Ricardo Brown in 1985 to win the coveted Most Valuable Player award. Jimmy Alapag won the Rookie of the Year honors to wrap up the Phone Pals' incredible year.

2004–05 Talk 'N Text Phone Pals season

Joel Banal resigned as Ateneo head coach to concentrate on the Talk 'N Text team. In the 2004 PBA Fiesta Conference, the Phone Pals were bannered by 2002 MVP Willie Miller and Yancy de Ocampo in separate deals with Red Bull and FedEx.

The Phone Pals made it to the semis of the tournament, but lost in a three-game showdown with crowd favorite Barangay Ginebra Kings.

In the 2004–05 Philippine Cup, the Phone Pals placed second in the classification phase to qualify for the semifinals. They swept the Shell Turbo Chargers but were defeated in six games by Barangay Ginebra.

During this tournament, Asi Taulava was considered by the Department of Justice as one of six Filipino-foreigners suspected of falsifying their documents. Taulava was suspended by the PBA indefinitely, along with five other players.

Taulava gained some advantage from the Quezon City RTC, but the PBA still didn't give Taulava the go-signal. In the Finals of the Philippine Cup, the Phone Pals used Taulava despite the league's refusal to allow Taulava. Talk 'N Text reasoned a court order that allowed Asi to play in the series. The Phone Pals wound up winning Game One by double figures, but the game was forfeited two days later, awarding the win to Barangay Ginebra. The Phone Pals later announced that they would not allow Taulava to play for the rest of the series.

In the 2004–05 Fiesta Conference, the Phone Pals finished first after the classification phase, earning an outright semifinals berth. In the semis, the Phone Pals eliminated the soon departing Shell Turbo Chargers, 3–1, to face San Miguel in the finals series.

Taulava was once again used by Talk 'N Text, but this time the league gave the go-signal for Taulava to return and play for his mother ballclub. Asi showed rustiness during the series as the Phone Pals lost the series to San Miguel, 4–1. Willie Miller was named as the Best Player of the Conference.

2005–06 Talk 'N Text Phone Pals season

Talk 'N Text acquired rookies Jay Washington and Mark Cardona from the Air21 Express for Yancy de Ocampo and Patrick Fran in separate deals.

The Phone Pals were considered as top favorites in the 2005–06 Fiesta Conference. However, the Phone Pals lost in five grueling games to Air21 in the quarterfinals.  During the series, import Damien Cantrell was replaced by former Detroit Piston and NBA champion Darvin Ham. However, Ham did not fit in Talk 'N Text's system, and struggled.

After the disappointing finish in this tournament, Joel Banal resigned as head coach and was replaced by returning coach Derrick Pumaren (his second stint after the 1997 season). The change made some good strides in the early stages of his second stint with Talk 'N Text. With Pumaren using the star players Asi Taulava and Jimmy Alapag, and mixing Harvey Carey and seldom-used rookie Mark Cardona, the Phone Pals went 5–4 through nine games of the Philippine Cup.

However, the Phone Pals suffered three succeeding losses, prompting team officials to land Ren-Ren Ritualo from Air21 for Leo Avenido and a future first round draft pick, Don Allado from Alaska for Willie Miller, John Ferriols and a future first round pick on May 8. The move saw the Phone Pals as a potential title contender with the squad boasting a group of star players from their past teams along with Taulava, Alapag, Cardona and Carey. Even with a strong lineup, the trade put the Phone Pals in a deeper hole, losing three more games before a win against Coca-Cola gave them a disappointing 6–10 card.

In the wildcard phase, the Phone Pals did not win a single game in the round-robin format. In their initial game, Talk 'N Text lost to Barangay Ginebra, eliminating them from quarterfinal contention before losing their final two games to Air21 and Sta. Lucia.

The Phone Pals had a shot of taking the No. 1 pick in the draft but they traded that rights to Air21 in a trade months ago, which dealt a big blow to the franchise. Rumors then speculated that TNT management was set to make drastic changes for the team after their disappointing season.

2006–07 Talk 'N Text Phone Pals season

Talk 'N Text released Poch Juinio, while the contracts of Vergel Meneses and Chris Cantonjos were not renewed, leaving the team with only 10 players. The Phone Pals participated in the 2006 NBA Summer Pro League. In the 2006 PBA Draft, they selected Mark Andaya in the first round, their only pick in the draft.

Talk 'N Text managed to start off big in the 2006-07 PBA Philippine Cup, but a string of losses put them beneath the standings. A late surge, followed by a crucial Christmas Day victory over Ginebra, gave the team a 10–8 record and a quarterfinals berth against Purefoods. The Phone Pals won the series 3–1, dethroning the defending Philippine Cup champions by winning the next three games by convincing margins. At the semifinals, they took crowd favorite Barangay Ginebra Kings to six games but they were eliminated by the eventual champions; they defeated Red Bull Barako in the third-place game.

In the 2007 PBA Fiesta Conference, the Phone Pals barged into the Finals (Despite Taulava,Alapag & Ritualo loan to national team) after surviving a quarterfinal scare against the Air21 Express and upsetting first seed Red Bull Barako to face the Alaska Aces. The Aces drew first blood by taking game 1 but fell behind with a 1–2 series deficit after newly crowned Best Player of the Conference Mark Cardona scoring big. Newly crowned MVP candidate Willie Miller erupted for 29 points to tie the series. Cardona then had an answer when he top-scored all locals on Game 5.

Cardona gave the ball away in the dying seconds for the Aces to tie the series 3-all. Game 7 was a tight affair but the Aces broke through with a Miller steal off Cardona to seal Talk 'N Text's third successive Finals defeat.

The end of the Asi Taulava era

Talk 'N Text was a rising powerhouse team after the 2007 Fiesta Conference Finals, with a star-studded line-up bannered by Asi Taulava, Jimmy Alapag, Don Allado, Jay Washington, Harvey Carey, Renren Ritualo, Mac-Mac Cardona, and Yousif Aljamal. However, former MVP Taulava's point production dipped when he opted to concentrate on the defensive end. His dismal performance on the team cost him his slot at the Phone Pals roster. On November 26, 2007, the Asi Taulava era at Talk 'N Text officially ended when the prized Fil-Tongan center was shipped to the Coca-Cola Tigers in exchange for Ali Peek and a 2008 first-round draft pick.

Taulava and the Tigers then had a 5-game winning streak, while the Phone Pals could only muster a three-win streak of their own. On the final game of the elimination round, with TNT needing to win to force a playoff for the last quarterfinal berth, Taulava and the Tigers beat the Phone Pals to deny them the playoff and instead arranged a sudden death wildcard game between the two teams. With Taulava and another ex-Phone Pal Mark Telan playing inspired basketball, the Tigers eliminated the #6 seed Phone Pals in the first wildcard round.

This led to rumors of team management firing Derrick Pumaren and his staff, but after a meeting with the players, it was decided to defer the decision until after the next tournament, the 2008 PBA Fiesta Conference.

However, on January 28, 2008, it was announced that former San Miguel Beermen head coach Chot Reyes would replace Pumaren as coach.

In the 2008 Fiesta Conference, Talk 'N Text had a 5-game losing streak after starting with a 7–3 record to finish with a 9–9 record. This caused them to go through the wildcard phase once again; after beating Purefoods in a fight-marred contest, the Phone Pals dropped at the second wildcard round against the Sta. Lucia Realtors to deny them of quarterfinal qualification for the 2007–08 season.

The team announced a new name for the 2008–09 season, the Talk 'N Text Tropang Texters. They drafted Jared Dillinger and Singapore Slingers' Jayson Castro, who had left the team after the team left Australia's National Basketball League, center Robert Reyes. The Texters relied on Mark Cardona to finish with an 11–7 record, good for second place and a semifinal berth, behind Alaska. Cardona participated in the last two plays that led to their Finals qualification, beating the San Miguel Beermen in Game 6. The Texters and the Aces faced off anew in the Finals, this time with Talk 'N Text winning in seven games, thanks to Cardona, Alapag and Ranidel de Ocampo's plays down the stretch in Game 7.

2009–10 season

During the off-season, Tropang Texters signed Nic Belasco and dealt 18th draft pick Kevin White to the Gin Kings. They have also transferred Yousif Aljamal and Rob Reyes to the Barako Bull. After a lot of deliberation, Japeth Aguilar finally was ousted from the Burger King Whoppers as he was forwarded to the Talk 'N Text Tropang Texters in exchange for four first round future picks (2010, 2012, 2013, 2014) and undisclosed amount of money.

TNT walk out against Ginebra during their Game 4 of the Quarter Finals and they failed to defend their title. As a preparation for the Fiesta Conference they traded Ren-Ren Ritualo and Yancy de Ocampo to the Air 21 in exchange for JR Quinahan, Mark Yee and Aaron Aban. While TNT has 8–2 win/lose record, They traded Pong Escobal, Ali Peek and Nic Belasco to Sta Lucia Realators in exchange of Kelly Williams, Ryan Reyes and Charles Waters. After the trade, they had a 7-game winning streak, but lost to their last assignment Bmeg gave them a 15–3 win/lose record good for first place. In the semis, They lost to the Tim Cone mentored Alaska Aces into seven games, due to foul out early Talk N Text's import Shawn Daniels.

2010–11 season (Alapag–Castro-De Ocampo Era)
The beginning of the 2010s saw the dominance of the Talk 'N Text Tropang Texters, who nearly got the Grand Slam in the 2010–11 season when winning the 2010–11 PBA Philippine Cup and 2011 PBA Commissioner's Cup, but they eventually were the runner-up in the 2011 PBA Governors' Cup, where Petron was the champion.

TNT won the 2010–2011 Philippine Cup Championship on February 4, 2011, after beating San Miguel Beermen in Game 6 with a score of 95–82. Jayson Castro and his teammate, Jimmy Alapag were awarded as co-MVP of the finals. The team won the Championship in the 2011 Commissioner's Cup on May 8, 2011, in an epic overtime win against Barangay Ginebra Kings in Game 6 of their best-of-seven series with a score of 99–96. The Finals MVP were once more awarded to both Jayson Castro and Jimmy Alapag. This was the team's fourth championship of which three were achieved under coach Chot Reyes's tenure.

Coming into the Governor's Cup, TNT were heavy favorites as they aimed for the rare triple crown conference.  They ended up at first place in the elimination with a 6–2 win–loss record, and added three wins against two losses in the semifinal round to secure the first finals seat, eventually facing the depleted Petron Blaze Boosters in a full seven-game series which started with a buzzer beater win by Petron in game 1. Their shot at the Grandslam was revived when they recovered from a 3–2 deficit to force a Game 7 but eventually lost to Petron, 85–73 in game 7.

2011–12 PBA Philippine Cup

This was the first time that Talk 'N Text and Powerade faced each other in the finals, since the 2003 PBA All-Filipino Cup, which Talk 'N Text won the series in five games.

Talk 'N Text won the championship series, 4–1 becoming the first team in league history to win back-to-back All-Filipino crown after 27 years, since 1985.

2012–13 PBA Philippine Cup

Talk 'N Text defeated Rain or Shine by sweeping the series, 4–0 and winning their third consecutive Philippine Cup taking permanent possession of the Jun Bernardino Trophy, which is awarded to the champions of the tournament since the 2006–07 season.

2013–14 Talk 'N Text Tropang Texters season
In Philippine cup Tropang Texters are qualified in eliminations, finishing with 8–6 record, but lost to San Mig Coffee Mixers in best of 3 quarter finals matches. Before the playoffs started, Talk 'N Text was traded Sean Anthony, rookie Eliud Poligrates and a 2016 first-round pick to Air21 in exchange for Niño "KG" Canaleta.

2013–14 PBA Commissioner's Cup
Talk 'N Text finished the elimination round of 2014 PBA Commissioner's Cup undefeated with 9–0 and they defeated Barangay Ginebra San Miguel on the quarterfinals with twice to beat advantage in only first game and they defeated and sweep once again the semifinals against their former rival Rain or Shine Elasto Painters, 3–0 to extend the streak which makes them the first team in 34 years to enter the PBA Finals undefeated with 13–0 (or since Crispa went 17–0 to enter 1980 All-Filipino Finals). Their import Richard Howell recorded a career high 30 rebounds, surpassing his previous record of 20, in an 85–72 victory over the Alaska Aces in his first game for the Texters. They will defend their streak as they will face the San Mig Super Coffee Mixers on the best of 5 series in the finals. They got their first loss to the Mixers on the game 1 of the finals but they were able to bounce back on game 2 to tie the series to 1–1 but lost again to the Mixers on game 3, 77–75.  Before game 4 started, the awarding ceremony was held which was won by Richard Howell as the Best Import and Jayson Castro as the Best Player and the Texters hoping to tie the series on game 4 were unsuccessful, 100–91, and so the Mixers won the championship and the series 3–1.

2013–14 PBA Governors' Cup
The Texters finished the elimination round of the Governors' Cup as solo top seed with 7–2 record and earned the twice-to-beat advantage on the quarterfinals where they beat the Barako Bull Energy in one game, 99–84. They fought the San Mig Super Coffee Mixers in a best of 5 series in the semifinals. They lost the first and second game of the series, forcing a do-or-die situation. As a result, they won the third and fourth games to make it tie the series at 2–2. However they lose to the Mixers and did not make it to the finals, losing the series 3–2. Despite to their loss, the Texters and their fans admired their import Paul Harris for his never-give-up performance for his team.

2014–15 PBA season: Rise of Jayson Castro

On July 9, 2014, prior to the start of the 2014–2015 PBA Philippine Cup, the Texters' former coach Norman Black was named as the new head coach of the Meralco Bolts while the Texters' former assistant coach Jong Uichico was named as the new head coach for the Texters for the next season.

On September 18, 2014, the Texters started to reload their roster, acquiring Robert Labagala from Barako Bull Energy where he was reunited with his former Ginebra San Miguel coach Jong Uichico.

On September 22, 2014, the Texters were involved in a three-team trade, sending Nonoy Baclao to GlobalPort Batang Pier in exchange for Jay Washington, Rookie Harold Arboleda to NLEX Road Warriors in exchange for Rookie Matt Ganuelas, the Texters’ first-round pick in the 2017 Rookie Draft and second-round pick in the 2018 Rookie Draft. Then NLEX sent Kevin Alas to TNT for Kg Canaleta, Blackwater gets Larry Rodriguez and TNT's 2015 first-round draft pick, TNT gets Kevin Alas and 2015 first-round Draft Pick, NLEX Get KG Canaleta in 3-team trade.

2014–15 Philippine Cup
On the opening day of the PBA Philippine Cup on October 19, 2014, they faced Barangay Ginebra San Miguel, but lost by 20 points, 81–101. On December 5, the Texters finished their last game for the elimination with an 8–3 win–loss record when they beat the San Miguel Beermen, 107–101, and clinched their twice-to-beat advantage to the quarterfinals.

On December 12 they beat the Barako Bull Energy in the first phase of the quarterfinals with 105–76 to advanced on the second phase of the quarterfinals. On December 16 they beat the Barangay Ginebra San Miguel in a knock-out game, 83–67, and advanced to the semifinals to face the San Miguel Beermen. The Texters fought the San Miguel Beermen on a best of seven of the semifinals and due to lack of legitimate center, they got swept by the Beermen, 4–0.

Jimmy Alapag's retirement/End of the Jimmy Alapag era

On January 9, 2015, the Texters' long-time Team Captain Jimmy Alapag formally announced his retirement during a press conference at the Smart Araneta Coliseum prior to the second game of the 2014–15 PBA Philippine Cup Finals between the Alaska Aces and the San Miguel Beermen. However, he took on a new role as the team manager.

2015 PBA Commissioner's Cup
As the new Team Manager Jimmy Alapag first move was to bring back the 2014 PBA Commissioner's Cup Best Import, Richard Howell, as they prepared for 2015 PBA Commissioner's Cup. On January 25, 2015, The 37-year-old, two-time MVP Willie Miller, in an interview with InterAksyon.com, said that he has agreed to terms with the Tropang Texters, a franchise he played several seasons for in the past. On January 28, 2015, the Texters won their first game for the conference against the Rain or Shine Elasto Painters, 89–86. On February 18, The Texters made a surprise decision by replacing Richard Howell with Ivan Johnson, formerly with the Atlanta Hawks. On March 22, 2015, the Texters finished their last game for the elimination with an 8–3 win–loss record when they beat the Alaska Aces, 101–93 and clinched their twice-to-beat advantage to the quarterfinals.

On March 28, 2015, they beat the Barako Bull Energy by 30 points, 127–97 and advanced to the semifinals to once again face the Purefoods Star Hotshots, formerly known as San Mig Super Coffee Mixers, last season in a best-of-5 series. On April 11, they beat the Hotshots on semifinals, 3–1, and dethroned the Hotshots. The Texters advanced to the finals to face their former rival the Rain or Shine Elasto Painters in a best of 7 series. On April 15, 2015, The texters won game 1 of the finals against Rain or Shine Elasto Painters, 99–92. On April 17, 2015, Talk 'N Text lost to Rain or Shine in Game 2, 108–116, despite Jayson Castro's effort (scoring career-high 44 points in a 9/14 three-point FGs, 3 steals, 3 assist, 3 rebounds). They lost again on game 3, 109–97 but won on game 4 and game 5, 99–92 and 103–94 and led the series 3–2.  However, on April 26, they lost on game 6 with 101–93, forcing the series the finals into a seven-game series. On April 29, 2015, the Texters won the championship on double overtime, 121–118. Jayson Castro was named as Best Player of the Conference and Team Captain Ranidel De Ocampo was named as the Finals MVP.

2015 PBA Governors' Cup

On April 12, 2015, they acquired Steffphon Pettigrew as their import. On May 15, 2015, they acquired the former Jordan National team playmaker Sam Daghles as their Asian import for this upcoming conference. The Texters lost their chance for the PBA Governors' Cup title (the only championship they have not yet won) after they failing to make it to the playoffs, with a 5–6 win-lose record and finishing tenth.

46th PBA season

Chot Reyes comeback

On February 13, 2021, TNT Tropang Giga brought back Chot Reyes for head coaching job after almost a decade. Under Reyes, they have won a championship in the 2021 Philippine Cup championship and appeared in the Finals of the 2022 Philippine Cup, However they lost to eventual champions San Miguel Beermen in seven games, where San Miguel was the champion.

2021 PBA 3x3 inaugural season

On March 19, 2021, TNT Tropang Giga signed Jeremiah Gray to a one-year contract to play in the inaugural PBA 3x3 tournament.

Current roster

Season-by-season records

Records from the 2022–23 PBA season:

*one-game playoffs**team had the twice-to-beat advantage

Retired numbers

  – The Talk 'N Text Tropang Texters retired the jersey number of Jimmy Alapag during the All-Star Weekend, where he was added as the 13th man of the South All-Stars.

Awards

Individual awards

PBA Press Corps Individual Awards

All-Star Weekend

Notable players

Members of the PBA's 40 greatest players

Jerry Codiñera – played for Mobiline from 1999 to 2001.
Alberto Guidaben – played for Pepsi/7-Up from 1990 to 1993.
Vergel Meneses – played for Talk 'N Text on 2006.
Willie Miller – played for Talk 'N Text from 2004 to 2006 season and then return at 2015 Commissioners Cup.
Asi Taulava – played for Talk 'N Text Phone Pals from 1999 to 2007.
Kelly Williams – played for Talk 'N Text from 2010 to present.
Jimmy Alapag – played for Talk 'N Text from 2003 to 2015.
Jayson Castro – played for Talk 'N Text from 2008 to present.

Head coaches

References

 
1990 establishments in the Philippines
Basketball teams established in 1990